Mark Aaron Hatton (born 24 January 1974 in Waverley, New South Wales) was an Australian cricketer who played for the Tasmania and the Canberra Comets. He was a left-arm orthodox bowler, and the brother of Northern Territory cricketer, Brad Hatton.

See also
 List of Tasmanian representative cricketers

External links
 

1974 births
Living people
Australian cricketers
Tasmania cricketers
ACT Comets cricketers
Cricketers from Sydney